Juan Ernesto Soto Arévalo (born 14 October 1977) is a Venezuelan football referee. Soto has been a FIFA international referee since 2005. He is a civil engineer by profession.

References

External links
Bio at worldreferee.com

1977 births
Living people
Venezuelan football referees
Copa América referees
Olympic football referees
Football referees at the 2012 Summer Olympics
Venezuelan civil engineers
Sportspeople from Caracas
21st-century Venezuelan people